Layla Pascal "Lili" Iskandar (born 16 May 2002) is a Lebanese footballer who plays as an attacking midfielder for Jordanian club Etihad and the Lebanon national team. A versatile forward, Iskandar can also play as a winger.

Starting out at Salam Zgharta in 2018–19, scoring 10 goals, Iskandar moved to reigning champions SAS. In her first season at the club (2019–20), she helped SAS lift their fifth league title, scoring 15 goals in the process. Iskandar joined Danish side HB Køge, before signing for Etihad in Jordan.

Iskandar represented Lebanon at the youth level, winning the 2019 WAFF U-18 Girls Championship as the competition's top goalscorer. Iskandar has also played at senior level since 2018. She helped Lebanon finish runners-up at the WAFF Women's Championship in 2022 as the competition's best player, and in third place in 2019.

Club career

Lebanon 
Iskandar played for hometown club Salam Zgharta during the 2018–19 season, scoring 10 goals. In 2019 she moved to reigning champions SAS. In the final matchday of the season, Iskandar scored a brace against EFP to help her side win the 2019–20 league title. She ended the season with 15 goals, scoring at a rate of more than one goal per game.

HB Køge 
On 9 July 2021, Iskandar moved to HB Køge in the Elitedivisionen on a one-year contract.

Etihad 
On 3 July 2022, Iskandar joined Jordan Women's Football League club Etihad. She noted that the main reason for choosing the club was reuniting with former Lebanon national team coach Wael Gharzeddine. Iskandar scored her first goal on 17 July, helping Etihad beat Al-Nasr 3–0 in the league.

International career

Youth 
Iskandar's first international goal came on her debut for the Lebanon under-19 national team, on 24 October 2018, in a 2019 AFC U-19 Championship qualification match against Hong Kong. She played four games during the qualifiers, scoring once. Iskandar was the top goalscorer of the 2019 WAFF U-18 Girls Championship, which she won, scoring seven goals in five matches.

In December 2020, Iskandar played two friendly games against Egypt U19, a 3–1 defeat and a 3–2 win, scoring in both games. With her two goals against Egypt, Iskandar became the first player to reach 10 goals for the under-18 and under-19 teams.

Senior 
Iskandar's senior debut for Lebanon came on 8 November 2018, coming on as a substitute against Iran in a 2020 AFC Olympic qualification match. Iskandar also played four games for Lebanon at the 2019 WAFF Championship, helping her team reach third place. On 24 October 2021, Iskandar scored her first goal in a 2022 AFC Asian Cup qualification game against Guam, which ended in a 3–0 win.

Iskandar took part in the 2022 WAFF Women's Championship; she helped her side finish runners-up as the tournament's best player, scoring one goal against Palestine on 29 August.

Style of play 
Iskandar is an attacking midfielder with good finishing, who is also capable of creating attacking chances.

Personal life 
Iskandar speaks three languages: English, French, and Arabic. Her idol is American footballer Alex Morgan, who she described as a "lady on and off the pitch".

Career statistics

International
Scores and results list Lebanon's goal tally first, score column indicates score after each Iskandar goal.

Honours 
SAS
 Lebanese Women's Football League: 2019–20

Lebanon U18
 WAFF U-18 Girls Championship: 2019

Lebanon
 WAFF Women's Championship runner-up: 2022; third place: 2019

Individual
 WAFF Women's Championship best player: 2022
 WAFF U-18 Girls Championship top goalscorer: 2019

See also
 List of Lebanon women's international footballers

References

External links

 Profile at HB Køge
 
 
 
 

2002 births
Living people
People from Zgharta
Lebanese women's footballers
Women's association football midfielders
Women's association football wingers
Salam Zgharta FC (women) players
Stars Association for Sports players
HB Køge (women) players
Lebanese Women's Football League players
Jordan Women's Football League players
Lebanon women's youth international footballers
Lebanon women's international footballers
Lebanese expatriate women's footballers
Lebanese expatriate sportspeople in Denmark
Lebanese expatriate sportspeople in Jordan
Expatriate women's footballers in Denmark
Expatriate women's footballers in Jordan